The Chairman's Sprint Prize is a Group 1 Thoroughbred horse race in Hong Kong, run over a distance of 1200 metres. Until 2000, it was run as the Hong Kong Sprint Championship to coincide with the opening of Sha Tin Racecourse. In 2016, this race become the 4th round of the Global Sprint Challenge, and was elevated to International Group 1 status. This race offers a purse of HK$16,000,000.

Winners since 1994

See also
 List of Hong Kong horse races

References

Racing Post:
 The Hong Kong Jockey Club official website of Chairman's Sprint (2011/12)
  Racing Information of Chairman's Sprint (2011/12)
 The Hong Kong Jockey Club 

Horse races in Hong Kong
Open sprint category horse races